Football 7-a-side at the 1988 Summer Paralympics consisted of a men's team event.

Medal summary

Results
Five countries competed in a round-robin tournament.

See also 
Football at the 1988 Summer Olympics

References 

 

 
1988 Summer Paralympics events
1988
Paralympics
1988
Para